Fermentimonas is a genus from the family of Dysgonomonadaceae, with one known species (Fermentimonas caenicola).

References

Further reading 
 

Bacteroidia
Bacteria genera
Monotypic bacteria genera